The 1982 Volvo International was a men's tennis tournament played on outdoor clay courts in North Conway, New Hampshire in the United States and was part of the 1982 Volvo Grand Prix. It was the 10th edition of the tournament and was held from July 26 through August 2, 1982. Second-seeded Ivan Lendl won the singles title.

Finals

Singles

 Ivan Lendl defeated  José Higueras 6–3, 6–2
 It was Lendl's 10th title of the year and the 29th of his career.

Doubles

 Sherwood Stewart /  Ferdi Taygan defeated  Pablo Arraya /  Eric Fromm 6–2, 7–6(7–3)
 It was Stewart's 7th title of the year and the 40th of his career. It was Taygan's 5th title of the year and the 14th of his career.

References

External links
 ITF tournament edition details

 
Volvo International
Volvo International
Volvo International
Volvo International
Volvo International